Robins Wood is a  biological Site of Special Scientific Interest between Tunbridge Wells and Ashford in Kent.

This is a deep valley along a stream in the Weald, and has the humid conditions typical of such areas. It has a diverse flora of mosses, ferns and liverworts, and woodland which is thought to date back to recolonisation after the last ice age ended 11,700 years ago.

Footpaths go through some parts of the site.

References

Sites of Special Scientific Interest in Kent
Forests and woodlands of Kent